The President of the Senate is the presiding officer or speaker of the Dewan Negara, the upper house of the Parliament of Malaysia.

The President of the Senate is created under Article 56 of the Constitution of Malaysia. The office is similar to the Speaker of the Dewan Rakyat:  the president is elected by the members of the Senate and is expected to be politically impartial.  If a member of the Dewan Negara is elected as the president and is a member of a state legislative assembly, he must resign from the assembly before exercising the functions of the office. As the president may hold different titles while in office, it also changes the style. The current president is Rais Yatim. Therefore, while in session, the senators will call him as 'Tuan Yang di-Pertua' (Mr. President).

Functions
The main functions of the President of the Dewan Negara are:
 to preside over the sittings of the Dewan Negara
 to be responsible for the observance of the rules in the Dewan Negara
 to ensure the relevancy of the points raised during the debate
 to interpret the Standing Orders in case of disputes and the decision is final

List of presidents of the Dewan Negara

Election results

List of deputy presidents of the Dewan Negara

Election results

See also
Dewan Negara
Parliament of Malaysia
Speaker of the Dewan Rakyat

References

External links
 Parliament of Malaysia (Official site)

Parliament of Malaysia